Ennio Mattarelli (born 5 August 1928) is an Italian sport shooter and Olympic champion. He won the gold medal in trap shooting at the 1964 Summer Olympics in Tokyo. He also competed at the 1968 Summer Olympics.

References

External links
 
 
 
 
 

1928 births
Living people
Sportspeople from Bologna
Italian male sport shooters
Trap and double trap shooters
Olympic shooters of Italy
Olympic gold medalists for Italy
Shooters at the 1964 Summer Olympics
Shooters at the 1968 Summer Olympics
Olympic medalists in shooting
Medalists at the 1964 Summer Olympics
20th-century Italian people